Marcquelle Jermaine Ward (born 8 November 1983 as Baby Caton) is a British actor, dancer and rapper. He's known for the role of "BB" on the musical TV drama series Britannia High and for playing Rum Tum Tugger in the 2015 West End revival of Cats.

Filmography
 2014 Banana : Paul Lumb
 2013 Pat and Cabbage : Rob
 2012 The World According to Mya : Marcquelle
 2011 McQueen : Liam 
 2011 Tati's Hotel: Bipper
 2011 Tracy Beaker Returns: You Choose - Cyberbullying (interactive web series) : Boyfriend
 2010 Doctors: Lucas Jones
 2009 Coronation Street: Mitch
 2008 The National Television Awards 2008: Himself
 2008 Britannia High: "BB"
 2007 DanceX: Himself

References

External links
 
 BBC - DanceX - Marcquelle Ward

English male television actors
English male dancers
English male rappers
1983 births
Living people
Rappers from Manchester
Black British male actors
British people of Barbadian descent